GLA Land and Property (GLAP) is a subsidiary company of the Greater London Authority. It was formed on 1 April 2012 as a replacement for the London Development Agency (LDA) as an arms length corporate body to take on the assets of the LDA and other agencies, under the direction of the Mayor of London. It is one of the largest public sector landowners in London and its primary aims are to create jobs and housing. GLAP is headquartered in Windsor House, Westminster in the offices used by Transport for London.

Formation
The Localism Act 2011 required that the assets and liabilities of the LDA should be transferred to the Greater London Authority, and that all commercial activities relating to land and property should be undertaken by a subsidiary company. According to the 2012/2013 report and accounts, the principal activities of GLAP are "the purchase, sale and development of land or property, and the holding of land or property for capital growth or rental". Its primary aims are creating jobs and housing in London.

Land holdings
635 hectares of land in Greater London are held by the company, transferred from the London Development Agency, London Thames Gateway Development Corporation (not including Queen Elizabeth Olympic Park) and the London part of the Homes and Communities Agency. The most significant single asset of GLAP is the Greenwich Peninsula and a high proportion of the land is in East London. In addition to the land owned by GLAP, the Greater London Authority owns the considerable property portfolios of the London Fire Brigade, Metropolitan Police Service and Transport for London. The following land holdings are over 10 hectares:
Greenwich Peninsula
Former Cane Hill Hospital site
Excel Centre
Beam Park
Beam Reach
Silvertown Quays
Crystal Palace National Sports Centre
London Sustainable Industries Park
Royals Business Park
Britannia Village
Land on the south side of King George V Dock
Former Parcelforce site, West Ham
University of East London

Governance
GLAP is held by a holding company called Greater London Authority Holdings Limited, created at the same time. Greater London Authority Holdings Limited does not trade and has no other subsidiaries.

GLAP is not permitted to borrow directly from the Public Works Loan Board, but the Greater London Authority can borrow on its behalf. This was needed because GLAP inherited a borrowing requirement of approximately £300m from the LDA. The liabilities transferred from the LDA include the costs of the compulsory purchase of land for the 2012 Olympic and Paralympic games. It is anticipated this will be repaid from the sale of other assets.

References

External links
GLA database of Land and Property

Economy of London
Greater London Authority functional bodies
2012 establishments in England
Government agencies established in 2012